Freezer burn is a condition that occurs when frozen food has been damaged by dehydration and oxidation due to air reaching the food. It is generally caused by food not being securely wrapped in air-tight packaging.

Freezer burn appears as grayish-brown leathery spots on frozen food and occurs when air reaches the food's surface and dries the product. Color changes result from chemical changes in the food's pigment. Freezer burn does not make the food unsafe; it merely causes dry spots in foods. The food remains usable and edible, but removing the freezer burns will improve the flavor. Also through sublimation, water is lost from the food into the surrounding atmosphere and the food becomes excessively dry. The water resublimates elsewhere in the food and packaging as snow-like crystals.

See also

Freeze drying
Ice crystals

References

Inline citations

General references
United States Food and Drug Administration

Food preservation
Frozen food